General Enrique Martínez, also known as La Charqueada, is a village in the Treinta y Tres Department of eastern Uruguay.

Geography
The village is located at the east end of Route 17, and the south end of Route 91, situated on the north bank of Cebollatí River and west of the mouth of the stream Arroyo del Parao.

History
It was founded in April 1914 and was the head of the judicial section "Ceibos". Its status was elevated to "Pueblo" (village) on 15 October 1963 by the Act of Ley Nº 13.167.

Population
In 2011 it had a population of 1,430.
 
Source: Instituto Nacional de Estadística de Uruguay

Economy

The economy based on agriculture, with extensive rice fields that make up part of the landscape, livestock and fish. Tourism is also important. It has a port that served to start trade with Brazil, exporting jerky products, which prompted the town to recently be renamed (La Charqueada).

Places of worship
 Mary Help of Christians Parish Church (Roman Catholic)

References

External links
INE map of General Enrique Martinez

Populated places in the Treinta y Tres Department